WCVA is a broadcast radio station licensed to Culpeper, Virginia, serving Culpeper and Culpeper County, Virginia.  WCVA is owned and operated by Piedmont Communications, Inc. and simulcasts the classic hits format of sister station 105.5 WOJL Louisa. Prior to February 2016, it had aired a satellite-fed adult standards format.

Translator
In early 2016, WCVA's programming began airing on 95.3 W237CA, an FM translator that had been purchased by Piedmont from Liberty University.

References

External links

1949 establishments in Virginia
Classic hits radio stations in the United States
Radio stations established in 1949
CVA